The 2010 Edinburgh Sevens (also known as Scotland Sevens) was a rugby sevens tournament, the eighth and final Cup tournament in the 2009–10 IRB Sevens World Series. The 2010 competition was held at Murrayfield Stadium between 29 May and 30 May.

Format
The tournament, as in all 16-team IRB Sevens events, consisted of four round-robin pools of four teams. All sixteen teams progressed to the knockout stage. The top two teams from each group progressed to quarter-finals in the main competition, with the winners of those quarter-finals competing in cup semi-finals and the losers competing in plate semi-finals. The bottom two teams from each group progressed to quarter-finals in the consolation competition, with the winners of those quarter-finals competing in bowl semi-finals and the losers competing in shield semi-finals.

Teams

Pool stages

Pool A
{| class="wikitable" style="text-align: center;"
|-
!width="200"|Team
!width="40"|Pld
!width="40"|W
!width="40"|D
!width="40"|L
!width="40"|PF
!width="40"|PA
!width="40"|+/-
!width="40"|Pts
|- 
|align=left| 
|3||2||0||1||90||62||28||7
|- 
|align=left| 
|3||2||0||1||62||38||24||7
|- 
|align=left| 
|3||2||0||1||68||48||20||7
|- 
|align=left| 
|3||0||0||3||24||96||−72||3
|}

Pool B
{| class="wikitable" style="text-align: center;"
|-
!width="200"|Team
!width="40"|Pld
!width="40"|W
!width="40"|D
!width="40"|L
!width="40"|PF
!width="40"|PA
!width="40"|+/-
!width="40"|Pts
|- 
|align=left| 
|3||3||0||0||133||17||116||9
|- 
|align=left| 
|3||2||0||1||85||36||49||7
|- 
|align=left| 
|3||1||0||2||31||88||−57||5
|- 
|align=left| 
|3||0||0||3||17||125||−108||3
|}

Pool C
{| class="wikitable" style="text-align: center;"
|-
!width="200"|Team
!width="40"|Pld
!width="40"|W
!width="40"|D
!width="40"|L
!width="40"|PF
!width="40"|PA
!width="40"|+/-
!width="40"|Pts
|- 
|align=left| 
|3||2||1||0||70||42||28||8
|- 
|align=left| 
|3||1||1||1||57||52||5||6
|- 
|align=left| 
|3||1||0||2||50||66||−16||5
|- 
|align=left| 
|3||1||0||2||40||57||−17||5
|}

Pool D
{| class="wikitable" style="text-align: center;"
|-
!width="200"|Team
!width="40"|Pld
!width="40"|W
!width="40"|D
!width="40"|L
!width="40"|PF
!width="40"|PA
!width="40"|+/-
!width="40"|Pts
|- 
|align=left| 
|3||3||0||0||97||47||50||9
|- 
|align=left| 
|3||2||0||1||64||50||14||7
|- 
|align=left| 
|3||1||0||2||47||69||−22||5
|- 
|align=left| 
|3||0||0||3||34||76||−42||3
|}

Knockout

Shield

Bowl

Plate

Cup

References

External links
UR7s.com Profile for the Edinburgh Sevens
Edinburgh Sevens
Scotland Sevens at irb.com

Edinburgh
Scotland Sevens
Edinburgh Sevens
Edinburgh Sevens